Franz Alt may refer to:

 Franz Alt (mathematician) (1910–2011), Austrian-born American mathematician
 Franz Alt (painter) (1821–1914), Austrian landscape painter
 Franz Alt (journalist) (b. 1938), German journalist